Lucas Pouille was the defending champion, but lost in the second round to Marcos Baghdatis.

Jo-Wilfried Tsonga won the title, defeating Pierre-Hugues Herbert in the final, 6–4, 6–2.

Seeds
The top four seeds received a bye into the second round.

Draw

Finals

Top half

Bottom half

Qualifying

Seeds

Qualifiers

Lucky losers

Qualifying draw

First qualifier

Second qualifier

Third qualifier

Fourth qualifier

References

External links
 Main Draw
 Qualifying Draw

Singles
2019 ATP Tour